The La Paz 25 is an American trailerable sailboat that was designed by Lyle C. Hess as a motorsailer and first built in 1973.

Production
The design was built by Coastal Recreation, Inc of Costa Mesa, California, United States starting in 1973, but it is now out of production.

Design
The La Paz 25 is a recreational keelboat, built predominantly of fiberglass, with wood trim. It has a fractional sloop rig, a raked stem, a plumb transom, an internally mounted spade-type rudder controlled by a port-side wheel and a fixed fin, shoal-draft keel. It displaces  and carries  of ballast.

The design has sleeping accommodation for six people, with a double "V"-berth in the bow cabin, two straight settee berths in the main cabin, with upper berths above them. The galley is located on both sides just forward of the companionway ladder. The galley is equipped with a three-burner stove and a sink. The head is located just aft of the bow cabin on the port side and includes a shower stall. The cockpit is open fore the use of deckchairs in place of fixed seats.

For sailing downwind the design may be equipped with a symmetrical spinnaker.

Operational history
In a 2010 review Steve Henkel wrote, "you can almost imagine the client talking to the designer, laying out his needs: “I want a fast, shallow draft, trailerable motorsailer I can easily tow with my pickup to Mexico—say La Paz—to launch off the beach and cruise for a few weeks with my wife, occasionally inviting a couple of my grown children to join us for a few days, maybe even with grandkids. I need good standing headroom below, a place for comfortable deck chairs in a spacious cockpit, and a stall shower. Oh, and ny wife is a gourmet cook who likes to bake bread, so we'll need space for a big stove with an oven. She'll spend a lot of time in the galley, so make it bright and airy down below.” That's a lot to ask, but Lyle Hess made a valiant attempt to satisfy the customer's needs. About the only thing missing is an inside steering station for sailing in inclement weather. Best features: She beats her comp[etitor]s in the space department—especially on headroom—and also on maximum speed (important under power, which motorsailors usually do a lot.) Worst features: With no centerboard and only two feet of draft, one shouldn't expect good upwind performance."

See also
List of sailing boat types

References

Keelboats
Motorsailers
1970s sailboat type designs
Sailing yachts
Trailer sailers
Sailboat types built in the United States
Sailboat type designs by Lyle Hess
Sailboat types built by Coastal Recreation, Inc